Paul Ritchie is the name of:

 Paul Ritchie (musician), American musician, producer, guitarist for The Parlor Mob
 Paul Ritchie (footballer, born 1969), Scottish football player (East Fife)
 Paul Ritchie (footballer, born 1975), Scottish football player (Heart of Midlothian)